Aleuria is a genus of cup fungi within the phylum Ascomycota. The best known species is Orange peel fungus, A. aurantia.

Aleuria species are saprobes.

Description
This genus is distinguished by the lack of gills, and epigeous nature.
The ascospores are distinctly reticulate.
Species are typically (but not always) bright in color.
ascocarps are typically over 1 cm in diameter.

Species

Aleuria alpina
Aleuria amplissima
Aleuria applanata
Aleuria ascophanoides
Aleuria aurantia
Aleuria balfour-browneae
Aleuria boudieri
Aleuria carbonicola
Aleuria cestrica
Aleuria crassa
Aleuria crassiuscula 
Aleuria crucibulum
Aleuria dalhousiensis
Aleuria exigua
Aleuria gigantea
Aleuria gonnermannii
Aleuria ingrica
Aleuria isochroa
Aleuria latispora
Aleuria lloydiana
Aleuria luteonitens
Aleuria marchica
Aleuria medogensis
Aleuria mellea
Aleuria membranacea
Aleuria mespiliformis
Aleuria michiganensis
Aleuria murreana
Aleuria nemorosa
Aleuria nucalis
Aleuria ollula
Aleuria pectinospora
Aleuria phaeospora
Aleuria reperta
Aleuria riparia
Aleuria saccardoi
Aleuria splendens
Aleuria sylvestris
Aleuria tectipus
Aleuria tuberculosa

References
C.J. Alexopolous, Charles W. Mims, M. Blackwell  et al., Introductory Mycology, 4th ed. (John Wiley and Sons, Hoboken NJ, 2004)  

Pyronemataceae
Pezizales genera
Taxa named by Karl Wilhelm Gottlieb Leopold Fuckel
Taxa described in 1870